Mohamed Saleh Qara'a is a Yemeni politician. He quit his position as a ruling party member over the 2011 Yemeni uprising.

References

21st-century Yemeni politicians
Living people
General People's Congress (Yemen) politicians
Year of birth missing (living people)
Place of birth missing (living people)